Laurentum was an ancient Roman city of Latium situated between Ostia and Lavinium, on the west coast of the Italian Peninsula southwest of Rome. Roman writers regarded it as the original capital of Italy, before Lavinium assumed that role after the death of King Latinus. In historical times, Laurentum was united with Lavinium, and the name Lauro-Lavinium is sometimes used to refer to both.

History 

According to Livy, in the 8th century BC at the time when Romulus and Titus Tatius jointly ruled Rome, the ambassadors of the Laurentes came to Rome but were beaten by Tatius' relatives.  The Laurentes complained; however, Tatius accorded more weight to the influence of his relatives than to the injury done the Laurentes.  When Tatius afterwards visited Lavinium to celebrate an anniversary sacrifice, he was slain in a tumult.  Romulus declined to go to war and instead renewed the treaty between Rome and Lavinium.

Under the Empire, Laurentum was the site of an imperial villa. Pliny the Younger may also have had a villa in the area.

Etymology 

The name Laurentum is either descended from many groves of Laurus nobilis (bay tree), or, according to Virgil, a single "sacred" laurel tree.

Laurentius (feminine Laurentia), meaning "someone from Laurentum" or "The one who wears a laurel wreath", was a common Roman given name. It survives in many regional forms, such as the Italian and Spanish name Lorenzo, the French name Laurent, the Romanian name Laurențiu, the Portuguese name Lourenço, the English name Laurence, the Dutch name Laurens, the Polish name Wawrzyniec, and the Nordic and German Lars, Lauri and Laurits/Lauritz/Lavrans/Lasse.

According to Virgil's Aeneid, the city of Laurentum and its people the Laurentines gained the name because the laurel tree was Latinus' favourite.

References

Roman sites in Lazio
Former populated places in Italy